EVOL is the third full-length studio album by the American alternative rock band Sonic Youth. Released in May 1986, EVOL was Sonic Youth’s first album on SST Records, and also the first album to feature then-new drummer Steve Shelley who had just replaced Bob Bert. 

In retrospective reviews, critics cite EVOL as marking Sonic Youth’s transition from their no wave roots toward a greater pop sensibility, while bassist Kim Gordon has referred to it as the band’s “goth record.” Pitchfork has praised the album, saying that EVOL "[was] where the seeds of greatness were sown", and placed the album 31st on their Top 100 Albums of the 1980s list, alongside Sonic Youth's next two albums, Sister and Daydream Nation, which ranked 14th and first, respectively.

Background and recording 
In June 1985, during the Bad Moon Rising tour, Bert left the band and was replaced by Shelley. The new lineup quickly began working on new material for their third album. The band signed to SST as, by 1986,  label founder Greg Ginn was anxious for the label to move away from its American hardcore roots. Sonic Youth took a break from the tour and finished the writing for EVOL. In March 1986, the band recorded the album at BC Studio with Martin Bisi. EVOL was the second time that the band had worked with New York singer and performance artist Lydia Lunch. Lunch had shared vocals on Bad Moon Rising's "Death Valley '69", and on this record, she co-wrote the song "Marilyn Moore".

Mike Watt played bass guitar on the tracks "In the Kingdom #19" and the band's cover of "Bubblegum". The band encouraged him to play on the former track shortly after Watt's fellow Minutemen band member D. Boon died in a car crash. Coincidentally, the song is also about a car crash. Watt had entered a severe depression following Boon's death and was considering leaving his career in music behind. He credited the time he spent with the members of Sonic Youth during the recording of EVOL as a major factor in his decision to re-enter the music world. Watt's next band, Firehose, would support Sonic Youth on their Flaming Telepaths tour. During this time, the band began the Ciccone Youth project, which featured all members of Sonic Youth and Watt. They released a single consisting of three tracks: "Into the Groove(y)" (a cover of Madonna's hit "Into the Groove", incorporating snippets of her recording) and the short "Tuff Titty Rap" on the A-side (both performed by the Sonic Youth members), and "Burnin' Up" (performed by Watt with additional guitars by Ginn) on the B-side. The project resulted in 1988's The Whitey Album.

On the vinyl version of the album, the time length for "Expressway to Yr. Skull" was indicated by the infinity symbol (∞); the final moment of the song featured a locked groove that repeatedly plays the last few seconds of a song, making it theoretically endless. The CD version added a bonus track: the band's cover of the Kim Fowley tune "Bubblegum". According to Watt, he and Shelley played the basic rhythm track over the actual Fowley record, which was afterwards removed when the other members added their parts.

Packaging 
The album cover features a picture of model/actress Lung Leg, a still taken from the Richard Kern film Submit to Me. Leg had previously appeared in the "Death Valley '69" music video (directed by Kern and Judith Barry). The back cover shows a black-and-white picture of the band in a heart-shaped frame. The album's 10 songs are listed in a different order than the actual track listing. The members' names are listed on the back cover as well, although no instruments are assigned for them. It reads "guitars, vocals, drums", with "bass" hidden beneath the photograph of the band. The insert features the lyrics to the songs and the A-side depicts Thurston Moore, with eyes drawn on his hands, holding them up to his face. This photograph was later used for the cover of the "Starpower" single. To the left of this photograph is a panel from the Marvel comic book The New Mutants (found on the second page of issue #14, published April 1984). The other side contains pictures from horror movies Friday the 13th Part 2 and Children of the Corn, with a still photo from the 1962 film House of Women featuring stars Constance Ford (sticking out her tongue) and Barbara Nichols in the upper right corner. This image is only featured on the initial SST vinyl pressing and vinyl reissues after 2010. It was blacked out for all other releases.

Promotion 
Sonic Youth debuted the new material for EVOL on April 12, 1986 in Austin, Texas; a recording of that show was later released in 1992 as Live at the Continental Club. EVOL was released in May 1986 by SST on vinyl and cassette. The band toured Europe in May and June, performing tracks from the album (although "In the Kingdom #19" and "Bubblegum" were never played live). The band also debuted "White Kross", which was later featured on Sister. Following the European tour, they toured America in June and July. In July, the band released the only single from EVOL, "Starpower". It was backed by "Bubblegum" and an edited version of "Expressway to Yr. Skull". A video was never released for "Starpower". However, a video for "Shadow of a Doubt" was released, directed by Kevin Kerslake and featuring Gordon sitting on a train. After the tour, the band recorded the Made in USA soundtrack, but it was not released until 1995. EVOL was released on CD in late 1986.

Critical reception 

EVOL has been well received by critics. Robert Christgau, with whom the band had sparred in previous years, gave the album a B+. It ranked number 4 among the "Albums of the Year" by NME. Slant Magazine, who placed EVOL at number 82 on their Best Albums of the 1980s list, described it as "one of [Sonic Youth's] strangest albums" and "a difficult album that's nonetheless one of the best latter-day invocations of no wave chaos." Pitchfork described the album as "the true departure point of Sonic Youth's musical evolution – in measured increments, Thurston Moore and Lee Ranaldo began to bring form to the formless, tune to the tuneless, and with the help of Steve Shelley's drums, they imposed melody and composition on their trademark dissonance." Pitchfork went on to say that EVOL "[was] where the seeds of greatness were sown", and placed it 31st on their list of the Top 100 Albums of the 1980s. Trouser Press labeled it "a near-masterpiece", and Stephen Thomas Erlewine of AllMusic gave it a 4.5-star review, writing that EVOL is "a stunningly fluent mixture of avant-garde instrumentation and subversions of rock & roll."

Track listing 

 Note: "Expressway to Yr. Skull" was listed on the back cover as "Madonna, Sean and Me" and on the lyric sheet as "The Crucifixion of Sean Penn".
 Note: "Secret Girl" was listed as "Secret Girls" on the inner label of the LP release.

Personnel 
Sonic Youth
 Thurston Moore – vocals, guitar, synthesizer, production
 Kim Gordon – vocals, bass guitar, guitar, piano ("Shadow of a Doubt"), production
 Lee Ranaldo – guitar, vocals, production, sleeve photography
 Steve Shelley – drums, programming, production

Guest musicians
 Mike Watt – bass guitar ("In the Kingdom #19", "Bubblegum")

Production
 Martin Bisi – production, engineering
 JG (John Golden) – mastering

Release history

References

External links 
 

Sonic Youth albums
1986 albums
SST Records albums
Albums produced by Martin Bisi
DGC Records albums
Blast First albums
Au Go Go Records albums
Noise rock albums by American artists